A Pleasant Journey is a 1923 silent short comedy film and the tenth Our Gang short subject comedy released. The Our Gang series (later known as "The Little Rascals") was created by Hal Roach in 1922, and continued production until 1944.

Plot

The gang decides to switch places with a group of runaway boys who are supposed to be taken by train back to San Francisco. While aboard the train, the gang wreaks havoc for the other passengers. Jackie rescues his dog, T-Bone, from the baggage compartment and this causes considerable disturbance with the conductor. He later changes clothes with a little girl, and they both get spankings by the adults. A traveling salesman volunteers to entertain the children with his noisemakers and fireworks. The gang then parade up and down the train with whistles and kazoos. They set off the fireworks, release sneezing powder, pass around other practical jokes and mayhem results. When they finally arrive at San Francisco, the child care worker receives a telegram informing him that he has the wrong children and must take them back.

Production notes
A Pleasant Journey was remade in 1932 as Choo-Choo!.

Cast

The Gang
 Jackie Condon — Jackie
 Mickey Daniels — Mickey
 Jack Davis — Jack
 Allen Hoskins — Farina
 Ernie Morrison — Ernie
 Mary Kornman — Mary
 Joe Cobb — Joe

Additional cast
 Elmo Billings — runaway orphan
 Doris Oelze — baby
 Gabe Saienz — runaway orphan
 Tommy Tucker — fat kid
 George "Freckles" Warde — boy throwing apples
 Charles A. Bachman — police sergeant
 Roy Brooks — chief of police
 Louise Cabo — mother
 William Gillespie — Tilford Gillespie
 Wallace Howe — welfare physician/man with gout
 Mark Jones — inebriated novelty salesman
 Sam Lufkin — cab driver
 Joseph Morrison — porter
 Charles Stevenson — conductor/police officer
 Charley Young — conductor
 George B. French — passenger
 Richard Daniels — passenger
 Clara Guiol — passenger
 Robert F. McGowan — man encountering Farina

See also
 Our Gang filmography

External links 
 
 

1923 films
Hal Roach Studios short films
American silent short films
American black-and-white films
1923 comedy films
Films directed by Robert F. McGowan
Our Gang films
1923 short films
1920s American films
Silent American comedy films